Maximilian Jansen (born 26 May 1993) is a German professional footballer who plays as a midfielder for FSV Zwickau.

Career
On 18 June 2019, Jansen joined R.E. Virton on a two-year contract with an option for one further year. However, he left the club again already at the end of August due to personal reasons. He moved to MSV Duisburg on 2 September 2019. He left Duisburg at the end of the 2020–21 season. He joined FSV Zwickau on 31 August 2021.

Career statistics

References

External links

1993 births
Living people
People from Datteln
Sportspeople from Münster (region)
German footballers
Footballers from North Rhine-Westphalia
Association football midfielders
VfL Bochum II players
Hallescher FC players
SV Sandhausen players
R.E. Virton players
MSV Duisburg players
FSV Zwickau players
2. Bundesliga players
3. Liga players
Regionalliga players
Challenger Pro League players
German expatriate footballers
German expatriate sportspeople in Belgium
Expatriate footballers in Belgium